is the northernmost point of the island of Honshu in Japan. It is located within the borders of the town of Ōma, Aomori in northern Shimokita Peninsula, and is part of the Shimokita Hantō Quasi-National Park. On a clear day, Mount Hakodate on the island of Hokkaido to the north can be seen.

Ōmazaki Lighthouse is located on a small island just offshore from Cape Ōma.

References

External links

Japan National Tourism Organisation (JMTO) site 

Ōma
Landforms of Aomori Prefecture
Tourist attractions in Aomori Prefecture
Oma
Extreme points of Japan